Muzzy Comes Back (also known as Muzzy 2) is a sequel to the animated TV film Muzzy in Gondoland, created by the BBC in 1989, as a way of teaching English as a second language.  It has been adapted, using changed text in speaking and subtitles, for teaching other languages, such as German.

Plot
Muzzy, the friendly, green, clock-eating extraterrestrial, returns for more adventures with his friends in Gondoland. Everyone expects him, and King Nigel and Queen Elza decide to arrange a ball for the christening of Bob and Sylvia's new baby daughter, Amanda. Meanwhile, Corvax, a servant and the villain of the previous film, invents an invisibility device, and with his assistant, 'Thimbo (the Terrible)', a thief on parole, makes plans to kidnap Amanda, to get revenge on Bob for tricking him and taking Sylvia away from him.

Corvax and Thimbo succeed in kidnapping Amanda, and they get away on Nigel's yacht. However, Amanda sinks the boat by pulling the plug out of the hull. The three manage to survive and they go to Corvax's hideout – a small hut, which turns out to be Corvax's operations centre. Meanwhile, Muzzy, Nigel, Ezra, Bob, and Sylvia follow Corvax's trail, recover Nigel's yacht, and track Corvax to his hideout.

At the same time, Corvax and Thimbo have a problem: Amanda gets hungry and wants to eat; while preparing the food, Thimbo lets the invisibility device loose; it is picked up by Amanda, who activates it. Corvax and Thimbo try, but fail to find Amanda. Muzzy, Nigel, Bob, Ezra, and Sylvia enter the hideout and confront Corvax. Thimbo confesses to Nigel that the hut is an operations center. Meanwhile, Amanda is found, but cannot be seen. Muzzy constructs another invisibility device and uses it to make Amanda visible. Everyone then goes back to the palace. In the end, Corvax and Thimbo ride with sheep to receive the unknown ultimate punishment offscreen (although it is accordingly known that, in Britain, this means 250 years in prison).

Cast
 Jack May as Muzzy (a furry, greenish-blue extraterrestrial), Norman's friend (a human)
 Willie Rushton as King Nigel (a lion), and some additional voices
 Miriam Margolyes as Queen Elza (a rat), Norman's wife (a human), and The Servant Maid (a bulldog)
 Susan Sheridan as Princess Sylvia (a rat), Amanda (a rat), and some additional voices
 Derek Griffiths as Bob (a mouse), Corvax (a green goblin), and some additional voices
 Peter Jones as Thimbo the Terrible (a bulldog), Guest #1 (a mouse), and The Shepherd (a pink goblin)
 Benjamin Whitrow as Norman (a human)

Credits
 Directed by Richard Taylor
 Executive Producer: Joe Hambrook
 Original English Scripts by Wendy Harris, Joe Hambrook, Richard Taylor
 Language Course Designer: Diana Webster
 Animation by Richard Taylor Cartoon Films Ltd.
 Additional animation by Bob Godfrey Films Ltd.
 Music by Peter Shade
 Produced by Richard Taylor Cartoon Films for BBC English Television

External links
 
 BBC Muzzy — Demos
 Early Advantage – Muzzy Products

References

1989 films
BBC Film films
British television films
British animated films
English-language education
English-language education television programming
1980s British films